Thou Shalt Not Lie is a 1915 American silent film directed by Clem Easton and starring William Garwood and Violet Mersereau. The film also starred Charles Ogle, and William Welsh.

References

External links

1915 drama films
1915 films
Silent American drama films
American silent short films
American black-and-white films
1915 short films
1910s American films